The Sakhray is a river of southwest Russia. It flows through the Republic of Adygea. It is a left tributary of the Dakh.

References

Rivers of Adygea